Viva Las Vengeance is the seventh and final studio album by American pop rock solo project Panic! at the Disco, released on August 19, 2022, through Fueled by Ramen and DCD2 Records. It is their first studio album in 4 years since their 2018 album: Pray for the Wicked, and the last album prior to the project's disbandment. It was announced alongside the release of the lead single and title track "Viva Las Vengeance" on June 1, 2022, and was supported by a tour that began in North America in the third quarter of 2022, and ended in Europe in 2023.

Background
Brendon Urie called the album "a look back at who I was 17 years ago and who I am now with the fondness I didn't have before. I didn't realize I was making an album and there was something about the tape machine that kept me honest." The album was also described as a "cinematic musical journey about the fine line between taking advantage of your youth, seizing the day, and burning out".

Recording
Urie recorded Viva Las Vengeance live to an 8-track tape machine to capture a "retro vibe". The album was recorded with notable contributions from Jake Sinclair, Mike Viola, and Butch Walker in Los Angeles.

Composition
Viva Las Vengeance has been described as pop rock, glam rock, power pop, rock and roll, and soft rock. The album also mixes new wave, punk, and baroque pop. It has also been considered to be a "classic-rock callback", adding to a "sound that showcases guitars and nods to the arena-rock sound of decades past, primarily the 1970s."

According to Chris Willman of Variety, while discussing the album's influences, "agreeable nods to the Police, Thin Lizzy, the Beatles and other late '60s/'70s/early '80s bands come fast and furious". The album is also noted for its similarities to Queen, with its "swooning theatricality and falsetto... sparkling guitar work, and well-timed harmonies". "Star Spangled Banger" and "God Killed Rock and Roll" have been cited as examples of Queen's influence.

Release
In May 2022, a website called "Shut Up and Go to Bed" was set up, hinting at new music from Panic! at the Disco the following month. This was followed by the announcement of the single "Viva Las Vengeance" on May 29, 2022. On July 20, 2022, the second single "Middle of a Breakup" was released. On August 5, 2022, the third single "Local God" was released. On August 16, 2022, the fourth single "Don't Let the Light Go Out" was released. The album was released on August 19, 2022. On the same day, a music video for the song "Sad Clown" was released. On August 23, 2022, a music video for the song "Sugar Soaker" was released.

Critical reception

Viva Las Vengeance was well-received by music critics. It holds an average score of 82 out of 100 on Metacritic based on seven reviews. Matt Collar of AllMusic described the album as a "declaration to everything sumptuously mythic, exultant, tragic, and...silly about loving and aspiring to be a part of the rock'n'roll world". Emily Swingle of Clash noted that "[the album] does knock out some definite singalongs", but also noted that "there is something missing beneath the veneer of theatricality". David Smyth of called the album "A classic-rock riot," and compared the guitar solos to Brian May.

Edwin Mcfee of Hot Press described the album as "A love letter to rock’s golden era." Ali Shutler of NME, complimented the sound of the album stating, Panic! typically strive for precision and polish but with this album recorded live to tape...[it] sounds like it belongs on a jukebox rather than Spotify, but...Panic! strut between the worlds of new wave, rock'n'roll and punk with utmost confidence. The Telegraph noted that "[while] originality has never been Urie’s forte, his pearly-white star power and finger-clicking showmanship ably make up for it."

Despite positive critical reception, fan reception was more mixed.

Track listing

Personnel
Musicians
 Brendon Urie – vocals, background vocals, drums, guitar, harpsichord, piano, synthesizer (all tracks); organ (2–12)
 Jake Sinclair – background vocals, bass, guitar, organ, synthesizer
 Mike Viola – background vocals, guitar, harpsichord, organ, piano, synthesizer
 Rachel White – background vocals (5–8)
 Butch Walker – background vocals (5), guitar (7, 12)

Technical
 Jake Sinclair – production
 Mike Viola – production
 Brendon Urie – production (2–12)
 Butch Walker – production (1)
 Bernie Grundman – mastering
 Claudius Mittendorfer – mixing, recording
 Rachel White – recording
 Johnny Morgan – production assistance
 Rouble Kapoor – production assistance
 Dan Pawlovich – drum technician (2–12)
 Rob Mathes - orchestral arrangements and conducting

Charts

Release history

References

2022 albums
Albums produced by Jake Sinclair (musician)
Fueled by Ramen albums
Panic! at the Disco albums